John Mowlem (9 August 1870 – 12 October 1951) was a New Zealand rugby union player. A forward, Mowlem thirteen times represented Manawatu at a provincial level, and after transfer to Greytown he played four matches for Wairarapa. He was a member of the New Zealand national side, the All Blacks, on the 1893 tour to Australia. He played four matches for the All Blacks, but did not play in an international.

References

1870 births
1951 deaths
New Zealand rugby union players
New Zealand international rugby union players
Manawatu rugby union players
Wairarapa rugby union players
Rugby union players from Lower Hutt
Rugby union forwards